Marion Monnier (born 1979) is a French film editor.

Filmography

References

External links
 

1979 births
Living people
French film editors
Place of birth missing (living people)
French women film editors